Liberty Township is one of eight townships in Fulton County, Indiana. As of the 2010 census, its population was 1,614 and it contained 889 housing units.

Geography

Cities and towns
 Fulton

Adjacent townships
 Rochester Township (north)
 Allen Township, Miami County (east)
 Union Township, Miami County (southeast)
 Adams Township, Cass County (south)
 Bethlehem Township, Cass County (southwest)
 Wayne Township (west)

Major highways
  Indiana State Road 25
  Indiana State Road 114

Cemeteries
The township contains three cemeteries: Fulton, Mount Olive and Salem.

References
 
 United States Census Bureau cartographic boundary files

External links
 Indiana Township Association
 United Township Association of Indiana

Townships in Fulton County, Indiana
Townships in Indiana